Johan Jørgen Schwartz (19 February 1824 – 17 March 1898) was a Norwegian politician and businessperson.

Schwartz was born at Drammen in Buskerud, Norway. He was the son of Hans Jürgen Schwartz (1785-1844) and Marie Cathrine Wærner (1803–89). He attended to  Drammen Latin School.  Schwartz first worked as a merchant in Drammen. He started its own company in 1848 and expanded it into one of the city's largest sawmills, timber trade and shipping company.

He was the mayor of Drammen (1862-1866). He sat in the Norwegian Parliament as part of the conservative wing between the period (1857-1876). He was a supporter of railways, and was active in passing Randsfjordbanen, Drammenbanen, Jarlsbergbanen and Vossebanen.
He was also director of Norges Bank in Drammen. Schwartz was a co-owner of Eidsfos Verk (1873–79). After an economic crisis, he went bankrupt in 1879 and retired from public business. His son,  Paul Lassen Schwartz  (1853-1922), joined the company which  bought the ironworks at Eidsfoss   out of bankruptcy in 1891.

References

External links
Biography of Johan Jørgen Schwartz

1824 births
1898 deaths
Norwegian businesspeople in shipping
Members of the Storting
Politicians from Drammen